Echinocereus scheeri is a species of hedgehog cactus in the family Cactaceae, native to northern Mexico. With its dramatic offsets, it has gained the Royal Horticultural Society's Award of Garden Merit.

Subtaxa
The following subspecies are currently accepted:
Echinocereus scheeri subsp. chaletii (W.Rischer) N.P.Taylor – Chihuahua
Echinocereus scheeri subsp. gentryi (Clover) N.P.Taylor – eastern Sonora to western Chihuahua
Echinocereus scheeri subsp. scheeri

References

scheeri
Endemic flora of Mexico
Flora of Northwestern Mexico
Flora of Northeastern Mexico
Plants described in 1856